Chen Zi (陈紫, Huiyang, 1919–1999) was a Chinese composer. He was one of the composers at the original revolutionary Lu Xun Academy in Yan'an and one of the collaborators assisting Ma Ke in composition of 1945's The White-Haired Girl. Among his works are the 1954 opera Liu Hulan (opera), and the 1956 opera Spring Blossoms (迎春花开了; Yingchunhua Kaile) co-composed with Liang Kexiang to a libretto by Lu Cang and Wang Lie.

References

Chinese male classical composers
1919 births
1999 deaths
People from Huiyang
20th-century classical composers
Chinese classical composers
20th-century Chinese musicians
Hakka musicians
20th-century male musicians